Dame Jacqueline Wilson  (née Aitken; born 17 December 1945) is an English novelist known for her popular children's literature. Her novels have been notable for featuring realistic topics such as adoption and divorce without alienating her large readership. Since her debut novel in 1969, Wilson has written over 100 books.

Early life
Jacqueline Aitken was born in Bath, Somerset, on 17 December 1945. Her father, Harry, was a civil servant and her mother, Biddy, was an antiques dealer. She particularly enjoyed books by Noel Streatfeild, as well as American classics like Little Women and What Katy Did. At the age of nine, she wrote her first "book", "Meet the Maggots",  which was 21 pages long. Wilson was given the nickname Jacky Daydream at school, which she later used as the title of her autobiography, which tells of her life as a primary school-aged child.

Wilson attended Coombe Girls' School in Surrey and Carshalton Technical College. After leaving school at age 16, she began training as a secretary but then applied to work with the Dundee-based publishing company DC Thomson on a new girls' magazine, Jackie.

Career

When Wilson began to focus on writing, she completed several crime fiction novels before dedicating herself to children's books. At the age of 40, she took A-level English and earned a grade A. She had mixed success with about 40 books before the breakthrough to fame in 1991 with The Story of Tracy Beaker, published by Doubleday.

As her children's novels frequently feature themes of adoption, divorce and mental illness, they tend to attract controversy, yet are well loved by children and adults alike.

University of Roehampton and charity work 
In June 2013, Wilson was appointed a professorial fellow of the University of Roehampton, and a Pro-Chancellor. In February 2014, it was announced that she would be appointed Chancellor of the university (its honorary figurehead) from August 2014. She was reappointed in 2017 for a further three years. She teaches modules in both the Children's Literature and Creative Writing master's degree (MA) programmes offered by the university. She concluded her term as Chancellor in August 2020.

Wilson is patron of the charity Momentum in Kingston upon Thames, Surrey, which helps Surrey children undergoing treatment for cancer (and their families), and also a patron of the Letterbox Club, a BookTrust initiative. Until she moved away from Kingston-upon-Thames she was a  patron of the Friends of Richmond Park.

Reception
In The Big Read, a 2003 poll conducted by the BBC, four of Wilson's books were ranked among the 100 most popular books in the UK: Double Act, Girls In Love, Vicky Angel, and The Story of Tracy Beaker. Fourteen books by Wilson ranked in the top 200. In 2002, she replaced Catherine Cookson as the most borrowed author in Britain's libraries, a position she retained until being overtaken by James Patterson in 2008.

Accolades
For her work, Wilson has won many awards including the Smarties Prize and the Guardian Children's Fiction Prize. The Illustrated Mum (1999) won the annual Guardian Prize, a book award judged by a panel of British children's writers, and the annual British Book Awards Children's Book of the Year; it also made the 1999 Whitbread Awards shortlist. The Story of Tracy Beaker won the 2002 Blue Peter People's Choice Award, and Girls in Tears was the Children's Book of the Year at the 2003 British Book Awards. Two of her books were "Highly Commended" runners-up for the annual Carnegie Medal: The Story of Tracy Beaker (1991) and Double Act (1995).

In June 2002, Wilson was appointed an OBE for services to literacy in schools and from 2005 to 2007 she served as the fourth Children's Laureate. In that role, Wilson urged parents and carers to continue reading aloud to children long after they are able to read for themselves. She also campaigned to make more books available for blind people and campaigned against cutbacks in children's television drama.

In October 2005, she received an honorary degree from the University of Winchester in recognition of her achievements in and on behalf of children's literature. In July 2007, the University of Roehampton awarded her an Honorary Doctorate (Doctor of Letters) in recognition of her achievements in and on behalf of children's literature. She has also received honorary degrees from the University of Dundee, the University of Bath and Kingston University.

In the 2008 New Year Honours, Wilson was appointed Dame Commander of the Order of the British Empire (DBE). In July 2012, Dame Jacqueline was also elected an honorary fellow of Corpus Christi College, Cambridge. In 2017, Wilson received the Special Award at the BAFTA Children's Awards.

For her lifetime contribution as a children's writer, Wilson was a UK nominee for the international Hans Christian Andersen Award in 2014.

A lecture hall at Kingston University's Penrhyn Road campus has been named after her.

Adaptations
A dramatisation of Wilson's Double Act, written and directed by Vicky Ireland, was first performed at The Polka Theatre in Wimbledon, London from 30 January to 12 April 2003, and toured throughout the UK. The playscript was published by Collins Plays Plus. Ireland has also written dramatisations of The Lottie Project (performed at Polka Theatre and San Pol Theatre, Madrid), Midnight, Bad Girls and Secrets, which were also commissioned by the Polka Theatre, and a dramatisation of The Suitcase Kid which was performed at the Orange Tree Theatre, Richmond and later toured throughout the UK. The scripts for these plays were published by Nick Hern Books.

The following books by Wilson have been adapted for television:
 Cliffhanger (1995, Channel 4). Part of Look, See and Read, two-part drama.
 Double Act (2002, Channel 4). Starring twins Zoe and Chloe Tempest-Jones as Ruby and Garnet, with a special appearance by Jacqueline Wilson as the casting director at the auditions. This was a one-off 100-minute feature.
 The Story of Tracy Beaker (2002–2006, CBBC). Starring Dani Harmer as Tracy and Lisa Coleman (whose sister, Charlotte, appeared in Double Act as Miss Debenham) as Cam. Original broadcast dates: 8 January 2002 – 9 February 2006. Since its original broadcasts, 15-minute versions have been shown on repeat on the CBBC Channel since 2007.
 The Illustrated Mum (2003, Channel 4). Starring former EastEnders star Michelle Collins as Marigold Westward, who won a BAFTA Award for her role, and who went on to play Stella Price in Coronation Street, Alice Connor as Dolphin Westward and Holly Grainger as Star Westward. This was a four-part mini-series but later shown as a full feature with no ad breaks. It was again repeated at Christmas 2004. Original broadcast date: 5 December 2003.
 Best Friends (2004, ITV). This was a six-part miniseries, but was originally broadcast as one feature with a slightly different ending. It starred Chloe Smyth as Gemma and Poppy Rogers as Alice. Original broadcast date: 3 December 2004.  This was repeated on the CITV Channel on 6 March 2010.
 Girls in Love (ITV). Starring Olivia Hallinan as Ellie, Zaraah Abrahams as Magda and Amy Kwolek as Nadine. There have been two series of Girls in Love broadcast. Original broadcast dates: 1 April 2003 – 18 April 2005.
 Dustbin Baby (BBC). Featuring an A-list cast including Juliet Stevenson as Marion, David Haig as a new character, Elliot,  and Dakota Blue Richards as April. Original broadcast date: 21 December 2008. 
 Tracy Beaker Returns (2010–2012). This is a series in which Tracy (Dani Harmer) returns to the "Dumping Ground" (Stowey House, whose name has been changed to Elm Tree House) to earn money for her new book because she used Cam's credit card without permission to publish it. She realises that Elm Tree House has changed and the new children act just like she did herself in her days. At times, she tries to help the children, concluding in the new social workers almost firing her. But sometimes she only gets the child's part of the story, then being told the whole thing and being totally confused and outraged.
 The Tracy Beaker Survival Files (2011–2012). A spin-off series where Tracy teaches lessons about various subjects using her stories from the past, and clips from The Story of Tracy Beaker and Tracy Beaker Returns. Original broadcast date: 17 December 2011 to 6 January 2012.
 The Dumping Ground (2013–). The continued life at the Dumping Ground after Tracy Beaker moves on to a new care home, and focuses more on just one child in the care home. Not a book by Jacqueline Wilson but inspired by the Tracy Beaker novels.
 The Dumping Ground Survival Files (2014-2020). A spin-off series where the Dumping Ground kids teach lessons about various subjects using stories that have happened to them and their friends in the past, using clips from Tracy Beaker Returns and The Dumping Ground.
 Hetty Feather (2015–2020). Stars Isabel Clifton as Hetty Feather, living her life in the Foundling Hospital and, later at the end of the third series, starting her life as a maid in service.
 The Dumping Ground: I'm... (2016–2021). A spin-off series similar to the Survival Files, but instead where the characters make videos about themselves, who they are, what they like and stuff that's happened to them in their life.
 Katy was made into a three-part TV series, Katy, broadcast on CBBC from 13 March 2018 to 16 March 2018.
 Four Children and It was adapted into a feature film named Four Kids and It.
 My Mum Tracy Beaker was adapted into a three-part television series for CBBC, My Mum Tracy Beaker, from 12 February 2021 to 14 February 2021.
 We Are The Beaker Girls was adapted into a television series, also for CBBC, The Beaker Girls, in December 2021, which shows Tracy and her life after she gets over her break-up with Sean Godfrey.

Personal life
In her teens, Jacqueline Aitken began a relationship with partner Millar Wilson, whom she married in 1965 when she was 19. Two years later, they had a daughter named Emma. Her husband later left her for another woman. They divorced in 2004.

In April 2020, Wilson announced she was in a same-sex relationship. She revealed that she had been living with her partner, Trish, for 18 years.

Wilson's health issues have included heart failure, having an implantable cardioverter-defibrillator, previously needing renal dialysis and now being the recipient of a kidney transplant.

Notes

References

Further reading 
 Parker, Vic. (2003) All About Jacqueline Wilson (Oxford: Heinemann Library)
'Dame Jacqueline Wilson's Nasty Adult World' The Telegraph, 8 March 2008.
 'Damehood for Tracy Beaker Creator' BBC News, 29 December 2007.
 'A Girl's own story' Article about Jacqueline Wilson by Lesley White, The Sunday Times, 18 February 2007.
 'My Inner age is between 10 and 40' Article about Jacqueline Wilson by Kate Kellaway, The Observer, 29 May 2005.
 'Profile: Jacqueline Wilson: Are you sitting uneasily, children?'The Sunday Times, 15 February 2004.
 'The Pied Piper of Kingston' Article about Jacqueline Wilson by Claire Amitstead, The Guardian, 14 February 2004.
 'Domestic Demons; In the latest Jacqueline Wilson book to be televised' by Susan Flockhart, The Sunday Herald, 28 December 2003

External links

 
 
 

1945 births
Living people
20th-century English novelists
20th-century English women writers
21st-century English novelists
21st-century English women writers
Academics of the University of Roehampton
British Children's Laureate
Costa Book Award winners
Dames Commander of the Order of the British Empire
English autobiographers
English children's writers
English women novelists
Fellows of Corpus Christi College, Cambridge
Fellows of the Royal Society of Literature
Guardian Children's Fiction Prize winners
Kidney transplant recipients
English lesbian writers
People from Bath, Somerset
People from Kingston upon Thames
British women children's writers
English women non-fiction writers
Women autobiographers
English LGBT writers